The Tautuku River originates in the Maclennan Range of The Catlins in New Zealand.  It continues through native bush for almost its entire length, including McLean Falls.  Near its mouth at Tautuku Bay, just north of Tautuku Peninsula, the river flows through the Tautuku Estuary, a breeding ground for fernbirds.

The river's lowermost stretch through the estuary can be used for kayaking.

See also
List of rivers of New Zealand

References

Rivers of Otago
The Catlins
Rivers of New Zealand
Clutha District